Alice Ann Hanson (née Brown; May 6, 1927 – February 7, 2009) was a politician from Alberta, Canada. She served in the Legislative Assembly of Alberta from 1993 to 1997 as a member of the Liberal caucus in opposition.

Political career
Hanson ran for a seat in the Alberta Legislature as a Liberal candidate in the electoral district of Edmonton-Highlands-Beverly in the 1993 general election. She defeated incumbent John McInnis and future MLA Ron Liepert.

Hanson served as the Native Affairs Critic and Social Services Critic for the official opposition. She did not run for re-election in 1997.

References

External links
Legislative Assembly of Alberta Members Listing
State of politics in Alberta
See Magazine

1927 births
2009 deaths
Alberta Liberal Party MLAs
Politicians from Edmonton
Women MLAs in Alberta
20th-century Canadian women politicians